So Excited! is the ninth studio album by the Pointer Sisters, released in 1982 on the Planet label.

History
So Excited! spawned a hit with "American Music" and included a cover of a Prince tune, "I Feel for You," which was covered by Chaka Khan two years later. The title track reached No. 30 on the pop charts but hit No. 9 when it was revived two years later after being added to the group's 1983 album, Break Out. A third single, "See How the Love Goes", was shelved due to its controversial subject matter. The album was remastered and issued on CD with bonus tracks in 2010 by Big Break Records.

Track listing

Personnel 
The Pointer Sisters
 Anita Pointer – lead vocals (1, 2, 6, 8), backing vocals, vocal arrangements
 June Pointer – lead vocals (3, 5-7), backing vocals, vocal arrangements
 Ruth Pointer – lead vocals (4, 6), backing vocals, vocal arrangements

Musicians
 John Barnes – acoustic piano (1, 8), keyboards (2, 3, 7), Fender Rhodes (6)
 Michael Boddicker – synthesizer programming (1, 4-7)
 Greg Phillinganes – synthesizers (1, 4, 6), synthesizer arrangements (4), synth solo (5-7)
 William "Smitty" Smith – organ (1)
 Robbie Buchanan – vocoder (2), synthesizers (2, 6-8)
 Ed Walsh – synthesizers (2, 3, 5)
 Randy Waldman – keyboards (4)
 Johnny Parker – synthesizers (5), clavinet (5)
 George Doering – guitar (1, 8)
 Lee Ritenour – guitar (1, 2, 8)
 Paul Jackson Jr. – guitar (2-4, 6, 7), guitar solo (4)
 Waddy Wachtel – guitar solo (2)
 Tim May – guitar (3, 6, 7)
 Ira Newborn – guitar (4)
 Nathan Watts – bass (1, 6, 7)
 Nathan East – bass (2-5, 8)
 John Robinson – drums 
 Paulinho da Costa – percussion (1-4, 6-8)
 Gary Herbig – saxophone (6)
 Jim Horn – saxophone (6)
 Trevor Lawrence – rhythm track arrangements, horn arrangements (3, 6), tenor sax solo (8)
 Dick Hyde – trombone (3, 6)
 Chuck Findley – trumpet (3, 6)
 Gary Grant – trumpet (3, 6)
 Richard Perry – rhythm track arrangements

Production
 Producer – Richard Perry
 Associate producer – Trevor Lawrence 
 Production coordination – Susan Epstein and Bradford Rosenberg
 Recording engineer, Editing and Remixing Assistance – Gabe Veltri
 Remix engineer – Bill Schnee
 Assistant engineers – Michael Brooks, Stuart Furusho and Bobby Gerber.
 Mastering – Larry Emerine and Stephen Marcussen at Precision Mastering (Hollywood, CA).
 Music coordinator – Eddie Choran
 Music preparation – Peggy Sandvig
 Design and artwork – Kosh
 Cover photography – Norman Seeff
 Fashion coordination – Susan Epstein 
 Make-up – Lewis Rabkin

Charts

References

External links
 

1982 albums
The Pointer Sisters albums
Albums produced by Richard Perry
Planet Records albums
RCA Records albums